Bedford School is a public school (English fee-charging boarding and day school for boys) in the county town of Bedford in England. Founded in 1552, it is the oldest of four independent schools in Bedford run by the Harpur Trust.

Bedford School is composed of the Preparatory School (ages 7 to 13) and the Upper School (ages 13 to 18). There are around 1,100 pupils, of whom approximately one half are boarders. In 2014, James Hodgson succeeded John Moule as headmaster after he moved on as headmaster of Radley College, another independent school for boys.

The school has produced six Nobel Prize winner, five recipients of the Victoria Cross, twenty-four rugby internationals, the winners of eight Olympic gold medals, and a former England cricket captain, Alastair Cook.

Bedford School was named Independent Boys’ School of the Year 2021 in the much-coveted annual Independent Schools of the Year Awards.

History

A school was established in Bedford as early as the thirteenth century, adjacent to St Paul's Church. The current Bedford School was established on 15 August 1552, when the Mayor, Bailiffs, Burgesses and Commonality of Bedford were, by letters patent issued by Edward VI, granted the right to establish a school which was to provide "education, institution and instruction of Boys and Youths in Grammar, Literature and Good Manners." The driving force behind the establishment of the school was John Williams, Mayor of Bedford three times between 1546 and 1552, and MP for Bedford between 1554 and 1555. Born in Bedford in c1519, Williams had purchased several hundred pounds of former monastic property in 1544-45 following the Dissolution of the Monasteries. This included the old schoolhouse, and during Williams' first mayoralty, between 1546 and 1547, the Bedford church of St Peter Dunstable was demolished and the materials were utilised in carrying out repairs to the school. Shortly thereafter, William Harper (born in Bedford in c1496) and his wife, Alice, set out to provide funds for an educational endowment in perpetuity (later known as the Harpur Trust) for the "poore chylders ther to be nurryshed and informed". The endowment included buildings in Bedford and thirteen acres of land acquired by Harper in Holborn. And so, conveying this endowment to the corporation of Bedford on 22 April 1566, Harper provided Bedford School with new buildings at its second location, in St Paul's Square, and a house for the headmaster, Edmund Greene. Elected Lord Mayor of London in 1561 and knighted by Queen Elizabeth I in 1562, William Harper's coat of arms and crest included the eagle which remains a symbol for Bedford School.

In the 1680s, as a consequence of London's rapid expansion in the late seventeenth century, the land in Holborn, with which William Harper had endowed Bedford School in 1566, was built upon. The rental value of the thirteen acres of land and three roods of meadow, purchased by Harper in 1564 for just £180 13s, soared and the future of Bedford School was assured.

Harper's surname was changed to 'Harpur' in 1764, nearly two centuries after his death. This was supposedly in the belief that the new spelling looked much better when used in a Latin inscription, still visible today, below the statue of Harper on the facade of the old school buildings in St Paul's Square. Whatever the truth of this story, in that same year, 1764, the Harpur Trust was formally created by Act of Parliament to administer Bedford School's endowment.

James Surtees Phillpotts was appointed as the twenty-second headmaster of Bedford School in 1874, at the age of thirty-five, and he remained in that position until his retirement in 1903. It was during his time as headmaster that, on 29 October 1891, a procession of masters, pupils and old boys moved the school from its site in St Paul's Square to its third, current, and far more spacious location in buildings constructed on land to the north of St Peter's Green.

The new Main School Building, in Gothic Revival style, included a great hall with galleries opening to classrooms on the second and third floors. The ground floor included the headmaster's study, the Bell Room, common rooms for masters and, later, for monitors, as well as more classrooms. Access to the upper floors was by narrow staircases situated at each end of the building.

Bedford School's Main School Building remained in this form until a disastrous fire on 3 March 1979 destroyed all but the west end where the Bell Room and the headmaster's study were located. All that remained of the rest of the building was the brick shell which was incorporated in the restored building. The restored Main School Building was opened on 10 September 1981. In the interim the school functioned in twenty-two temporary huts and by using the Howard and Craig buildings on the school estate.

In 2005, Bedford School was one of fifty of the country's leading independent schools which were accused of running a price-fixing cartel which had allowed them to push up school fees. Each school was required to pay a nominal penalty of £10,000 and all agreed to make ex-gratia payments totalling £3 million into a trust designed to benefit pupils who attended the schools during the period in respect of which fee information was shared.

The school estate has seen many developments over the past century, most recently the erection of two new buildings: the new Library in 2004, and the new Music School in 2006. Work on the construction of a new school theatre is currently proceeding apace.

Buildings and grounds

Main School Building

The Main School Building, originally built in 1891, is a Gothic Revival Grade II listed building. On the night of 3–4 March 1979, much of the building was gutted by fire as a result of arson. The internal structure of the building was destroyed and thirty classrooms were lost. Almost all pupil records were saved but books, furniture and the large collection of portraits of former headmasters were lost. Nevertheless, the school was in full operation on Monday 5 March.

The integral structure of the walls was not affected by the fire, and under the indefatigable leadership of the headmaster, Ian Jones, and two Chairmen of the Harpur Trust, John Howard and Anthony Abrahams, the building was restored within two years. The architect, Philip Dowson, made a number of alterations to the building during the restoration process: the most important was the raising of the central Great Hall to first floor level in order to provide more classroom and administrative space on the ground floor below.

Chapel

Bedford School Chapel was completed in 1908 and is a Grade II* listed building. It is significant as the last architectural accomplishment of George Frederick Bodley, a prominent Victorian architect who worked in the Gothic Revival style. Other notable buildings by Bodley include the chapels of Marlborough College and Queens' College, Cambridge.

In 2005, various refurbishment projects took place within the chapel. Most significantly, the ceiling was restored to its former Bodlian watercolour design, the original having been painted over in the 1960s due to deterioration. At the same time, the interior walls were redecorated and the stonework cleaned.

The chapel is home to Bedford School's chapel choir and houses a fine two-manual Hill, Norman & Beard organ. The specification of this instrument can be found in the National Pipe Organ Register.

Observatory and planetarium
The Charles Piazzi Smyth Observatory and the Wolfson Planetarium were opened in May 2002 by Prince Philip, Duke of Edinburgh. Situated on the Bedford School estate, the facility is operated by the school's astronomer in conjunction with members of the Bedford Astronomical Society.

The observatory was named after an Old Bedfordian who went on to become the Astronomer Royal for Scotland. It boasts a custom-designed GRP dome and a computer-controlled twelve-inch (305mm) telescope. The telescope has a hydrogen alpha filter, which enables the observer to view the magnetic plasma flow around the sun. The adjacent Planetarium was named after the Wolfson Foundation.

Music school
Bedford School Music Department is housed in the new purpose-built Music School, designed by Eric Parry, and completed in November 2005. The building houses a large recital hall with recording facilities, a recording studio, individual specialised teaching and practice rooms, and a rock music studio. The building was officially opened by Peter Maxwell Davies, Master of the Queen's Music, in March 2006, and the recording facilities were officially opened by David Arnold on 20 May 2013.

Cricket ground
The first recorded match on the Bedford School cricket ground was played in 1876, between Bedfordshire and Huntingdonshire. Bedfordshire played its first Minor Counties Championship match on the ground in 1895, against Hertfordshire. Since 1895, the ground has been host to 181 Minor Counties Championship matches. In addition, the ground has been host to five MCCA Knockout Trophy matches for Bedfordshire, the first played in 1993 between Bedfordshire and Cambridgeshire.

The ground has been host to two List-A matches for Northamptonshire: the first was played in the 1971 John Player League, between Northamptonshire and Lancashire; and the second was played in 1982, in the same competition and between the same two sides. It has also been host to twenty-five Second XI fixtures for the Northamptonshire Second XI in the Second XI Championship for the Second XI Trophy.

Prep school
Bedford Preparatory School is located within the estate of Bedford School. It caters for 450 boys aged 7 to 13, is situated on the same campus as the Upper School and, while sharing a number of whole school facilities, is a self-contained unit, maintaining its own identity and character.

Years 3 + 4
For the first two years the class teacher takes the major responsibility for subject teaching and then, as the boys move up the school, greater specialisation is introduced. In Year 3 and 4, it is normal for the class teacher to teach the three core subjects to their class along with at least two or three other subjects. The majority of the teaching takes place in the Nash's building and in Tisdall's. Boys will use the specialist facilities for French, art, ICT, music and design technology. These subjects are normally delivered by subject specialists. In addition, all boys will have physical education and swimming lessons alongside two double Games lessons. Boys are also encouraged to take a full part in the wide-ranging extracurricular programme.

On joining the school, boys are allocated to one of the four houses; Bunyan, Harpur, Howard or Whitbread, each comprising a housemaster, approximately 110 boys across the age range and eight members of staff. The well-established house system is central to school life; each is a community in its own right and has its own individual character.

Lunches are organised by house, with boys and staff eating together each day. A weekly assembly takes place on a house basis, as do regular outings and trips. Inter-house competitions are organised across the age range and in as many fields as possible and all boys are given the opportunity to represent their house.

Years 5 + 6
In Years 5 and 6 the academic and pastoral organisation changes. Setting is introduced in Year 5 for Mathematics. Boys will be assessed through the year by means of end of unit tests in the majority of subjects and end of year exams will be sat in the Summer Term.

Years 7 + 8
Years 7 and 8 are based in the Wells Building and pastorally are organised by house. Each house has three tutor groups composed of Year 7 and Year 8 boys. Each tutor group has a room in the Wells Building as a base. Boys will be taught in one of the five teaching groups for each year, with setting taking place in a range of subjects.

The breadth of the curriculum is maintained with the main development being the introduction of additional languages in Year 7. In addition to French, boys will study a module of German, Latin and Spanish during Year 7 and will be able to express a preference for one of the languages to study alongside French in Year 8.

The system of unit testing continues and in Year 8 boys sit two sets of exams in preparation for the transfer to the Upper School.

As well as the development in academic expectations it is also envisaged that boys will take on positions of responsibility in their house and in the school in general.

Moving into the upper school
In the Preparatory School, the foundations for future education have been laid. They move on to the Upper School. All have to sit a Transfer Examination and for certain boys the Academic Scholarship Examination may be an option. Boys who show a particular ability in Music or Sport will also have an opportunity to sit for a specific Scholarship (Art, Design Technology, Drama, ICT are no longer sittable for scholarships).

Year groups
The first year at Bedford School (for 13- to 14-year-olds) is called the Fourth Form and is equivalent to Year 9 in the state system. After that come the Remove and the Fifth Form. The next two years are the Lower Sixth and the Upper Sixth. Bedford School also caters for the lower years (from Year 3 to Year 8) in Bedford Preparatory School. This is located on the Bedford School estate and many facilities are shared.

Houses
Bedford School has six houses. Each house is composed of a day house and an associated boarding house. The day houses are areas for students to relax during breaks from teaching whilst the boarding houses are for students to reside in. The house names, dating from the mid-nineteenth century, refer to areas of Bedford; boys were originally allocated a house based on the area of town in which they lived. Whilst these are the official house names, it is common for boarders to refer to their house by the name of their boarding house. The houses are:

Ashburnham – The day house occupies a large building adjacent to the Design and Technology Building. The boarding house, Sandersons, known informally to students as ('Sandies'), is situated within a ten-minute walk of the school in Rothsay Gardens, adjacent to Redburn. The house colours are dark red and brown.

Bromham – The day house is situated on Burnaby Road at the main entrance to the school, next to the Rice Building. The school's sixth form boarding house, Burnaby, is situated on Burnaby Road. The house colours are light blue and navy blue.

Crescent – The day house is situated in a two-storey building towards the south of the school estate. The boarding house, Pemberley, is situated on Pemberley Avenue. The house colours are black and white. The name Crescent derives from The Crescent, a road to the north-east of Bedford town centre running between Bromham Road and Tavistock Street.

Paulo Pontine – The day house occupies a single storey ground floor area beneath the Art Department towards the south of the school estate. The boarding house, Redburn, is situated within a ten-minute walk of the school. The house colours are gold, brown and light blue. The house takes its name from the area around St Paul's Church ('Paulo') and the area south of the river, over the Town Bridge ('Pontine').

St Cuthbert's – The day house is located next door to the Medical Centre on Burnaby Road. The boarding house, Phillpotts, is situated in the north-east corner of the school estate. The house colours are dark blue and black.

St Peter's – The day house occupies a purpose-built building next to its boarding house, Talbots, on Burnaby Road. The house colours are scarlet (formerly cerise) and white.

School officials
Bedford School monitors are selected from amongst the boys of the Upper Sixth. They are entitled to wear coloured waistcoats and brown shoes as well as brass buttons on their blazers. The head of school and the deputy head are selected from amongst the monitors.

Colours

Bedford School recognises individual achievement in various fields by the awarding of 'colours', at the discretion of the appropriate master, to boys in the Fifth Form and above. The various colours entitle the bearer to wear a particular variant of his uniform, appropriate to that award, on given days. There are five types of colours: Academic, Arts, Headmaster's, House, and Sports (Major and Minor).

Academic colours – Awarded to Upper Sixth boys for outstanding academic achievement or for significant contributions to extracurricular academic activities supported by the school. Academic colours consist of a golden eagle to be worn on the blazer.

Arts colours – Awarded for excellence in art, music or drama. Arts colours consist of a white eagle on a purple patch.

Headmaster's colours – Awarded by the headmaster to a boy who has made a significant contribution to the school. Headmaster's colours are the highest form of colours to be awarded at Bedford School and are typically awarded only to one or two boys each year. Headmaster's colours consist of just a woollen scarf: navy blue with three vertical gold stripes and the school shield embroidered at either end. The scarf may be worn on a daily basis.

House colours – Awarded by a housemaster for contributions made to a boy's house, for example through success in an inter-house competition. House colours consist of a house tie with pronounced double stripes (thicker than on the standard house tie) and a knitted house scarf with multiple horizontal stripes, both in the house colours. House colours may be worn on a daily basis.

Major sports colours – Awarded for success when representing the school in one of the four major sports (cricket, hockey, rowing or rugby) by the master in charge of that sport and with the headmaster's approval. Major sports colours consist of a club tie (dull blue with thick double white stripes), plain cable-knit cricket jumper, blazer and other accessories. The tie and jumper are common to all sports whilst the blazer and other accessories vary between them. The tie, jumper and scarf may be worn on a daily basis whilst blazers and other accessories are reserved for High Days, Saturdays and match days. The variants for each of the major sports are as follows:

Cricket: royal blue and white vertically striped blazer with a breast pocket white eagle; royal blue and white striped cricket cap; no scarf.
Hockey: navy blue woollen blazer with a breast pocket white eagle within a red shield; dull blue woollen scarf with three sky blue vertical stripes.
Rowing: navy blue woollen blazer with white piping and a breast pocket white eagle; dull blue woollen scarf with white vertical stripes; white trousers.
Rugby: navy blue woollen blazer with a breast pocket navy blue eagle within a red shield; dull blue woollen scarf with three red vertical stripes.

Minor sports colours – Awarded for success when representing the school in a minor sport (i.e. any sport other than one of the four major sports) by the master in charge of that sport. Minor sports colours may also be awarded to successful second team players of major sports. Minor sports colours consist of a royal blue club tie with single white stripes, a woollen navy blue blazer with a white eagle on the breast pocket and a navy blue woollen scarf with three vertical stripes (royal blue on the edges, white in the centre). The tie and scarf may be worn on a daily basis; the blazer is reserved for High Days, Saturdays and match days.

Extracurricular activities

Chapel Choir

The Chapel Choir sings the weekly and special services in Bedford School Chapel. The choir consists of eighteen choristers from the Preparatory School and twenty-four choral scholars from the Upper School, many of whom are former cathedral choristers.

The Chapel Choir regularly sings services and performs concerts in English cathedrals, including St Paul's Cathedral and Westminster Abbey. The choir also tours abroad in alternate years. Previous destinations have included: Prague (1998); Oslo (2000); Paris (2002), where the choir sang mass in Notre Dame Cathedral; Rome (2004), where the choir sang mass in St. Peter's Basilica; Ireland (2006); Madrid (2008), and Belgium (2019) .

The choir has made several recordings in recent years. In 2007, the BBC recorded the school's Festival of Nine Lessons and Carols for transmission on Christmas Day of that year on BBC Radio under the direction of Andrew Morris, Director of Music at Bedford School between 1979 and 2011.They also recorded A CD entitled "A Bedford Christmas" in 2018.

Combined Cadet Force

One of the extracurricular activities at Bedford School is membership of the Combined Cadet Force. Bedford School CCF differs from other corps as it draws its members from two schools (Bedford School and Bedford Girls' School) and since membership is voluntary. The Bedford School Combined Cadet Force is one of the largest CCF contingents of any British school. The Head of Corps for the academic year of 2015/16 was Benno Schulz. For the year 2016/2017 Head of Corps was Oliver Horsfall. For the academic year of 2017/2018, the Head of Corps was Harriet Knights of Bedford Girls School. For the academic year of 2018/2019, the Head of Corps was Izzy Horsfall of Bedford Girls School. During the academic year 2019-20, the Head of Corps was James Brazil. For the year 2020-21, Harilaos Karavaggelis was Head of Corps. The school's CCF was affiliated with the Corps of Royal Engineers until 2018 when the role was taken over by the Intelligence Corps.

Music

Bedford School stages an annual concert programme, culminating in a series of summer concerts at the end of the academic year. There are a number of senior music groups, including the Bedford School First Orchestra, the Concert Band, the Choral Society, the Chapel Choir, and a large number of chamber groups. In addition, there is the Second Orchestra, the Chamber Orchestra and the Jazz Orchestra (formerly known as the Dance Band), as well as a number of jazz and rock bands. There is a musician in residence at the school.

School magazines
Bedford School produces several magazines, of which the most prominent is The Ousel, published regularly since 1876. It is largely written by boys and managed directly by the school. It is published at the end of each Summer term and contains pupil and staff reviews of the school year. The school's Mosaic Society runs the Mosaic magazine which contains a range of essays and articles written by boys on subjects ranging from current affairs and politics to sport and science. In 2011, the Classical Society introduced its new publication, VIM Magazine. Run entirely by the boys, with support provided by members of staff from the Classics Department, the magazine contains academic essays as well as more light-hearted articles on classical fashion and travel. It bears testament to the burgeoning resurgence of Classics at Bedford School.

Sport
Bedford School has a different major sport for each term. The Christmas term is rugby union orientated, the Easter term is devoted to hockey, and Summer is the cricket season. Rowing with the Bedford School Boat Club takes place on the River Ouse throughout the year. Other popular Bedford School sports include athletics, badminton, basketball, canoeing, cross-country running, fencing, fives, football, golf, rifle shooting, sailing, squash, swimming, table tennis, tennis, volleyball, water polo and weight training.

On the rugby field, Bedford School competes regularly against Dulwich College, Haileybury, Harrow School, Oakham School, Oundle School, Radley College, Rugby School, St Edward's School, Oxford, Stowe School, Uppingham School, Warwick School and Wellington College. Bedford School has also fielded rugby teams against Marlborough College, Merchant Taylors' School, Mill Hill School, RGS High Wycombe and St Paul's School, amongst other schools.

The school has produced many internationally famous sportsmen, including cricketer Alastair Cook, who went on to captain the England cricket team, and whose coach at Bedford School was sports master and former England batsman Derek Randall. Other famous Bedford School sportsmen include England rugby internationals Martin Bayfield and Andy Gomarsall; the rower Jack Beresford, winner of five Olympic medals; and 1924 Olympic 100-metre sprint gold medalist Harold Abrahams.

Headmasters
 2014–present James Hodgson (Wellington College; Cambridge University; Durham University)
 2008–2014 John Moule (Lady Margaret Hall, Oxford; Warden of Radley College)
 1990–2008 Philip Evans (Churchill College, Cambridge; Imperial College London)
 1988–1990 Michael Barlen (Hertford College, Oxford; New College, Oxford)
 1986–1988 Sidney Miller (Clifton College; Jesus College, Cambridge; Harvard University; headmaster of Kingston Grammar School)
 1975–1986 Ian Jones (Bishop's Stortford College; St John's College, Cambridge)
 1955–1975 William Brown (Bedford School; Pembroke College, Cambridge; headmaster of the King's School, Ely)
 1951–1955 Clarence Seaman (Christ's Hospital; St John's College, Oxford; rector of the Edinburgh Academy; headmaster of Christ's Hospital)
 1928–1951 Humfrey Grose-Hodge (Marlborough College; Pembroke College, Cambridge)
 1910–1928 Reginald Carter (Clifton College; Balliol College, Oxford; Fellow and tutor of Lincoln College, Oxford; Rector of the Edinburgh Academy)
 1903–1910 John Edward King (Clifton College; Fellow and tutor of Lincoln College, Oxford; high master of Manchester Grammar School; headmaster of Clifton College)
 1874–1903 James Surtees Phillpotts (Winchester College; Fellow of New College, Oxford)
 1855–1874 Frederick Fanshawe (Winchester College; Balliol College, Oxford; Fellow and tutor of Exeter College, Oxford)
 1811–1855 John Brereton (Winchester College; Fellow of New College, Oxford)
 1810–1811 William Stratford (Christ Church, Oxford; headmaster of Thame Grammar School)
 1773–1810 John Hooke (Fellow of New College, Oxford; headmaster of Thame Grammar School)
 1739–1773 George Bridle (Fellow of New College, Oxford)
 1718–1739 Matthew Priaulx (Fellow of New College, Oxford)
 1683–1718 Nicholas Aspinall (Emmanuel College, Cambridge)
 1681–1683 William Willis (Fellow of New College, Oxford)
 1672–1681 John Longworth (Fellow of New College, Oxford)
 1665–1672 John Butler (Winchester College; University College, Oxford)
 1663–1665 John Allanson (Chaplain of New College, Oxford)
 1660–1663 William Varney (reinstated as Master at the Restoration of the Monarchy)
 1656–1660 George Butler (Fellow of New College, Oxford)
 1636–1656 William Varney (deprived of the Mastership during the Protectorate due to his Royalist sympathies)
 1610–1636 Daniel Gardener (Fellow of New College, Oxford)
 1601–1610 Robert Barker (Fellow of New College, Oxford)
 c1599–1601 Henry Whitaker
 1597-c1599 Richard Butcher
 1587–1597 Master Chambers
 1577–1587 Francis White (Gonville and Caius College, Cambridge; Bishop of Carlisle; Bishop of Norwich; Bishop of Ely)
 1573–1577 William Smyth (Canon of Lincoln Cathedral)
 1548–1573 Edmund Greene (Fellow of New College, Oxford)
Edmund Greene was appointed as headmaster of Bedford School by the Mayor, Bailiffs, Burgesses and Commonality of Bedford following the dissolution of Newnham Priory in 1540. His appointment was made prior to Bedford School's refoundation in 1552. From then on the Wardens and Fellows of New College, Oxford were given the right to appoint the master (headmaster) and usher (deputy headmaster). The tradition of New College and Wykehamist appointees came to an end in 1903 with the appointment of John Edward King as headmaster.

Notable staff

Charles Abbot (1761–1817), Fellow of New College, Oxford, botanist and entomologist, Usher at Bedford School, 1787–1817
Robert Steele (1860–1944), Medievalist
W. H. D. Rouse (1863–1950), Fellow in Classics at Christ's College, Cambridge
Stanley Toyne (1881–1962), Historian, Hampshire and MCC cricketer
Jack Hobbs (1882–1963), Surrey and England cricketer
Rex Alston (1901–1994), a master at Bedford School, 1924–1941, before becoming a BBC sports commentator
Evelyn King (1907–1994), Labour MP, 1945–1950, Conservative MP, 1964–1979
John Durnford-Slater (1909–1972), raised the first Commando unit in 1940, Estate Bursar and Commanding Officer of the CCF at Bedford School
William Ronald Dalzell (1910–2004), book illustrator, author, and lecturer on the arts; art master, 1947-70
Godfrey Brown (1915–1995), History master, Olympic gold medal winner, 1936
Mary Midgley (1919–2018), moral philosopher
Jack Bailey (1930–2018), Essex and MCC cricketer, Secretary of the MCC, 1974–1987
Bernie Cotton (born 1948), Olympic hockey player, 1972, manager of the Great Britain Olympic hockey team, 1992
Andrew Morris (born 1948), conductor and organist, Director of Music at Bedford School, 1979–2011
Derek Randall (born 1951), Nottinghamshire and England cricketer
Gary Steer (born 1970) Derbyshire County Cricket Club

Notable former pupils

For details of notable alumni see List of people educated at Bedford School.

See also
List of high schools producing multiple Olympic gold medalists
List of English and Welsh endowed schools (19th century)

Notes

References

External links
 Bedford School official website
 Bedford School profile on the ISC website
 Bedford School profile on The Good Schools Guide website
 OFT price fixing article in The Guardian
 Bedford School Cricket Ground at CricketArchive
 Bedford School Cricket Ground at ESPNcricinfo

 
International Baccalaureate schools in England
Member schools of the Headmasters' and Headmistresses' Conference
Educational institutions established in the 1550s
1552 establishments in England
Boys' schools in Bedfordshire
Boarding schools in Bedfordshire
Private schools in the Borough of Bedford
Sports venues completed in 1876
Cricket grounds in Bedfordshire
Schools in Bedford